USS Electron (AG-146/AKS-27) -- also known as USS LST-1070 – was an  launched by the U.S. Navy, with LT. Richard P. Seem at the helm, during the final months of World War II. Electron served as both a cargo ship and as an electronic parts supply ship for the U.S. Pacific Fleet and was decommissioned following the Korean War.

Constructed at Hingham, Massachusetts
LST-1070 was launched 9 March 1945 by Bethlehem-Hingham Shipyard, Hingham, Massachusetts; and commissioned 5 April 1945.

World War II-related service
Sailing from New York City 19 May 1945, LST-1070 arrived in the Philippines 14 July and, except for one voyage to Tokyo Bay to carry occupation cargo, operated there until October.

She shifted to Japan briefly, then returned to Pearl Harbor 6 December to begin conversion to an electronics parts issue ship. In 1946 her conversion was halted and she sailed to the U.S. West Coast where she was placed out of commission in reserve 3 December at Astoria, Oregon She was reclassified AG-146, 27 January 1949, and assigned the name Electron, 1 February 1949.

Korean War service
Recommissioned 6 October 1950 as a result of the Korean War, Electron, with alterations completed at Bremerton, Washington, loaded electronic equipment at Oakland, California, for issue to the fleet.

She sailed from San Diego, California, 2 December for the Far East, arriving at Sasebo, Japan, 5 February 1951. She operated from this port and Yokosuka for the remainder of the Korean war, supplying and supporting Allied forces in the Far East during which time she was reclassified AKS-27 on 18 August 1951.

She remained in this duty after the war, and from 18 January 1955 to 30 April 1955 was stationed at Subic Bay. She returned to the U.S. West Coast in April 1956, and was again placed out of commission in reserve 16 November 1956.

Post-war disposal 
Electron was stricken from the Navy List 1 April 1960 and sold in December 1960.

Honors and awards
Electron was awarded one battle star for Korean War service:
 First UN Counter Offensive (29 to 30 March 1951 and 16 to 18 April 1951).

References
  
 NavSource Online: Amphibious Photo Archive - LST-1070 - AG-146 / AKS-27 Electron

 

Ships built in Hingham, Massachusetts
LST-542-class tank landing ships
World War II amphibious warfare vessels of the United States
Korean War auxiliary ships of the United States
Cold War auxiliary ships of the United States
Repair ships of the United States Navy
1945 ships
LST-542-class tank landing ships converted to stores ships